NYC Mesh is a physical network of interconnected routers and a group of enthusiasts working to support the expansion of the project as a freely accessible, open, wireless community network. NYC Mesh is not an  internet service provider (ISP), although it does connect to the internet and offer internet access as a service to members. The network includes over 1,000 active member nodes throughout the five boroughs of New York City, with concentrations of users in lower Manhattan and Brooklyn.

Aim 
The goal of NYC Mesh is to build a large scale, decentralized digital network, owned by those who run it, that will eventually cover all of New York City and neighboring urban areas.

Participation in the project is governed by its Network Commons License.
This agreement, partially modeled on a similar license in use by Guifi.net, lists four key tenets:
 Participants are free to use the network for any purpose that does not limit the freedom of others to do the same,
 Participants are free to know how the network and its components function,
 Participants are free to offer and accept services on the network on their own terms, and
 By joining the free network, participants agree to extend the network to others under the same conditions.

Other similar projects include Freifunk in Germany, Ninux in Italy, Sarantaporo.gr in Greece, the People's Open Network in Oakland, CA, and Red Hook Wi-Fi in Brooklyn, NY.

Technology 

Like many other free community-driven networks, NYC Mesh uses mesh technology to facilitate robustness and resiliency. NYC Mesh previously used BGP for routing within the network, though this was found to be too static so the network was changed to use OSPF routing instead. 

The network relies on a variety of wireless links to connect individual nodes and larger sections of the network together. Most nodes use both a long range directional antenna for up-link to a hub along with a shorter range omni-directional antenna that provides connections to other nearby nodes. This omni-directional antenna also includes a router and 5 port network switch. 

From the roof, cables are run to each apartment which is provided with Wi-Fi from an indoor Wi-Fi access point. Each node can support up to 4 apartments by itself, but can be upgraded to support more with additional equipment.

History 

NYC Mesh was founded in 2012 and was originally based on the Cjdns protocol. 

In 2015 the project received a grant from ISOC-NY, the New York chapter of the Internet Society.

NYC Mesh connects to the internet via the DE-CIX internet exchange point (IXP) at its first super node, Sabey Data Center at 375 Pearl Street, peering with companies such as Akamai, Apple, Google, and Hurricane Electric. Later, another supernode was opened up on the roof of the DataVerge (formerly ColoGuard) datacenter in Industry City, Brooklyn

The project received a membership boost due to the U.S. Federal Communications Commission vote in December 2017 to repeal its 2015 net neutrality rules. Coinciding with this decision, the average number of member sign-ups requests per month jumped from about 20 to over 400.

See also 
 DIY networking
 Mesh networking
 Net neutrality
 Freifunk
 Guifi.net

References

External links 

Community networks
Custom firmware
Mesh networking
Wireless